The 2013 Armed Forces Bowl was an  American college football bowl game that was played on December 30, 2013, at Amon G. Carter Stadium on the campus of Texas Christian University in Fort Worth, Texas.  The eleventh edition of the Armed Forces Bowl (which was originally known as the Fort Worth Bowl), it featured the Middle Tennessee Blue Raiders of Conference USA against the Navy Midshipmen, an independent team.  It began at 10:45 a.m. CST and aired on ESPN. It was one of the 2013–14 bowl games that concluded the 2013 FBS football season.  The game was sponsored by Bell Helicopter and was officially known as the Bell Helicopter Armed Forces Bowl.  Navy defeated Middle Tennessee by a score of 24–6.

The Midshipmen accepted their invitation after earning a 6–4 record in their first ten games of the season, while the Blue Raiders accepted their invitation after earning an 8–4 record in theirs.

Team selection

Middle Tennessee Blue Raiders

The Blue Raiders' first season as a member of Conference USA saw them continue their winning ways as they finished 8–4 overall and 6–2 in conference play (tied with the East Carolina Pirates for second in the C-USA East Division).  At season's end, bowl director Brant Ringler extended an invitation to the Blue Raiders to play in the game.

This was Middle Tennessee's first Armed Forces bowl.

Navy Midshipmen

In April 2009, organizers announced that they had reached a deal with Navy to play in the 2013 edition of the Armed Forces Bowl. After defeating the South Alabama Jaguars for their sixth win of the season on November 16, bowl director Brant Rigler extended an invitation to play in the game.

This was Navy's first Armed Forces Bowl, making them the last of the FBS' three service academies to reach the bowl (Air Force reached the bowl in 2007, 2008, 2009 and 2012, with Army reaching the bowl in 2010).

Game summary

Scoring summary

References

Armed Forces Bowl
Armed Forces Bowl
Middle Tennessee Blue Raiders football bowl games
Navy Midshipmen football bowl games
December 2013 sports events in the United States
Armed Forces Bowl
2010s in Fort Worth, Texas